Blake Austin Barnett (born December 24, 1995) is a former American football quarterback for the South Florida Bulls football team. He previously played college football for the Alabama Crimson Tide and the Arizona State Sun Devils.

Early years
Barnett attended Santiago High School in Corona, California. He played football for Santiago High School and was rated as a five-star recruit and was ranked among the top players in his class. He committed to the University of Alabama to play college football under head coach Nick Saban.

During his high school career, Barnett threw for 5,921 yards on 419 passes. He led the Santiago Sharks to round 2 of the CIF playoffs where they faced Upland high. Barnett and the Sharks came up short losing 29-30, ending his high school career.

College career
Barnett redshirted his first year at Alabama in 2015. Barnett entered his redshirt freshman season in 2016 as Alabama's starting quarterback, but lost the job to true freshman Jalen Hurts before halftime of the opening game against the USC Trojans.

On September 28, 2016, AL.com’s Matt Zenitz reported that Barnett had left the team and had decided to transfer from the University of Alabama. On December 5, 2016, Barnett announced that he was transferring to Arizona State University. After leaving Alabama and prior to transferring to Arizona State, Barnett immediately enrolled at Palomar College, which made him eligible to play for Arizona State in 2017. However, he was expected to be ineligible for the first four games of the 2017 season because he transferred from Alabama after four games into the 2016 season. Barnett appealed to the NCAA for immediate eligibility and on January 31, 2017, the NCAA ruled in favor of Barnett.

After being cleared to play immediately by the NCAA, Barnett was expected to be a strong contender to start right away at Arizona State, but incumbent starter Manny Wilkins won the quarterback derby and held onto his starting job. Barnett attempted only five passes during the 2017 season as the backup quarterback. In 2018, under new head coach Herm Edwards, Barnett was spending most sessions during the spring battling Dillon Sterling-Cole for the backup quarterback job behind Wilkins. On April 25, 2018, it was reported that Barnett intended to transfer from Arizona State. Barnett reportedly informed Arizona State his intention to transfer soon after the Arizona State spring game held on April 13.

On May 8, 2018, it was reported that Barnett was transferring to the University of South Florida. On May 18, 2018, USF announced the addition of Barnett as a graduate transfer.

References

External links
 Alabama Crimson Tide bio
 Arizona State Sun Devils bio
 USF Bulls bio

1995 births
Living people
Sportspeople from Corona, California
Sportspeople from San Bernardino County, California
Players of American football from California
American football quarterbacks
Alabama Crimson Tide football players
Arizona State Sun Devils football players
South Florida Bulls football players